Aurantiacibacter aquimixticola  is a Gram-negative, aerobic, rod-shaped and non-motile bacteria from the genus Aurantiacibacter which has been isolated from water from the Jeju island in Korea.

References

External links
Type strain of Erythrobacter aquimixticola at BacDive -  the Bacterial Diversity Metadatabase

Sphingomonadales
Bacteria described in 2017